Serbia and Albania: A Contribution to the Critique of the Conqueror Policy of the Serbian Bourgeoisie is a book by Serbian socialist Dimitrije Tucović, in which he analyzes the roots of Serbian-Albanian conflict.

After the outbreak of the Balkan Wars 1912, Tucović was mobilized in the Serbian Army and participated in the Serbian military campaign in Albania. He sent letters from the front about war crimes against Albanian population which were regularly published in the Worker's Newspaper (Radničke novine). After returning from the Balkan war, he published Serbia and Albania in which he criticize the militaristic policy of the Serbian bourgeoisie:

Reviews
Some consider the book to be "among the most important Marxist contributions on the national question in the Balkans".

Notes

1914 non-fiction books
20th-century history books
History books about wars
Serbian books
Political books
History books about Serbia
History books about Albania
Albania–Serbia relations
Kingdom of Serbia
1914 in Serbia
Marxist books